Simon Lucas Baker (born 30 July 1969) is an Australian actor in television and film, as well as a director. He is known for his lead roles in the CBS television series The Mentalist as Patrick Jane and The Guardian as Nicholas Fallin and has starred in several Hollywood films.

Early life
Baker was born on 30 July 1969 in Launceston, Tasmania. His father, Barry, was a mechanic and school caretaker, and his mother, Elizabeth, was a high school English teacher. He has an older sister, two half-brothers and a half-sister. Baker's family moved to New Guinea when Baker was nine months old. His parents' marriage ended when he was two and his father did not get in touch until Baker was an adult. His mother remarried to Tom Denny, a butcher, but Baker did not get on well with his stepfather. His mother and stepfather later got divorced.

Baker spent part of his childhood living in the suburbs of Sydney but he mainly grew up in the Northern Rivers coastal town of Lennox Head, New South Wales. He attended high school at Ballina High School and Trinity Catholic College. Baker has been an avid surfer since his youth and he considers surfing and the relationships with his surfing friends an important part of his upbringing.

Career
Baker's first acting role was in a commercial. He got the role while waiting for a friend to audition when he himself was asked to audition for it. Before working in Hollywood, he acted in various Australian television shows such as E Street (as Sam Farrel: 1992–1993), Home and Away (as James Hudson: 1993–1994), and Heartbreak High (as Tom Summers: 1996). In 1993, Baker won the Logie Award for Most Popular New Talent.

Baker relocated to the United States in the mid-90s. In 1997, Baker appeared as Matt Reynolds in L.A. Confidential.

He is known for his portrayal of Patrick Jane in the television series The Mentalist, and Nick Fallin in The Guardian.

In 2010, he was earning US$350,000 per episode of The Mentalist. Shortly after, he signed a contract that delivered a payment of US$30 million for his role as Patrick Jane.

In film, he is known for his roles as Max Rourke in the remake of the Japanese horror film The Ring Two, Riley Denbo in Land of the Dead and Christian Thompson in the film adaptation of The Devil Wears Prada.

Baker made his directorial debut with the 2017 film Breath, which he also starred in, co-wrote and co-produced. The film is based on Tim Winton's novel of the same title.

Honours
In June 2012, Baker was invited to join the Academy of Motion Picture Arts and Sciences along with 175 other individuals.

On 14 February 2013, Baker was honoured with a star on the Hollywood Walk of Fame for his contribution to the entertainment industry. Baker's star can be found at 6352 Hollywood Blvd.

Personal life
On 2 October 1998, Baker married Australian actress Rebecca Rigg after five years of living together. Baker told The Ellen Degeneres Show that one of their two weddings was held on the beach at Carmel. They have a daughter and two sons: Stella (b. 1993), Claude (b. 1998), and Harry (b. 2001). Baker and Rigg separated in April 2020.

In July 2009, Baker told PopMatters that he was raised Catholic, but is now agnostic.

Filmography

Film

Television

Awards and nominations

References

External links

 
 
 Simon Baker interview The Guardian Femail Magazine
 Simon Baker The Guardian The Age
 Simon Baker interview Land of the Dead Femail Magazine

Living people
1969 births
20th-century Australian male actors
21st-century Australian male actors
Australian agnostics
Australian expatriate male actors in the United States
Australian male film actors
Australian male television actors
Australian people of English descent
Australian people of Irish descent
Australian television directors
Logie Award winners
Male actors from New South Wales
Male actors from Tasmania
People from Launceston, Tasmania
People with acquired American citizenship